Lenur Yagya Arifov (10 December 1938 – 11 March 2018) was a physicist who conducted research on general relativity, gravity, cosmology, relativistic astrophysics and nuclear physics. Exiled from Crimea in 1944 as a young child because of the his Crimean Tatar ethnicity, he grew up in the Uzbek SSR, and eventually made it to Samarkand State University, where he became friends and colleagues with fellow Crimean Tatar physicist and civil rights activist Rollan Qadiyev, who he went on to co-author several scientific works with. Eventually he became a professor and received his doctorate. After returning to Crimea in 1992 he worked at the Department of Theoretical Physics in Simferopol State University.

References 

1938 births
2018 deaths
Crimean Tatar physicists
Soviet nuclear physicists
People from Yalta